A theatrical producer is a person who oversees all aspects of mounting a theatre production.  The producer is responsible for the overall financial and managerial functions of a production or venue, raises or provides financial backing, and hires personnel for creative positions (writer, director, designers, composer, choreographer—and in some cases, performers).

The independent producer usually initiates the production—finding the script and starting the process. The producer finds the director and pursues the primary goals, to balance and coordinate business and financial aspects in the service of the creative realization of the playwright's vision. This may include casting, but often only includes casting approval. The producer may secure funds for the production, either through their own company or by bringing investors into the production in a limited partnership agreement.  In this business structure, the producer becomes the general partner with unlimited liability, and because of this, often brings in other general partners. The producer probably has optioned the play from the playwright, which includes rights to future production for film and television.  The producer earns the right to future ventures because the original theatrical production enhances the value of an artistic property. This right to further options may be included in the royalty agreement.  In other duties, the producer may work with theatrical agents, negotiate with unions, find other staff, secure the theatre and rehearsal hall, obtain liability and workers' compensation insurance, and post bonds with unions.

The producer handles the business and legal end of employing staff, as in any business entity.  Hiring creative staff and teams generally involves the director and playwright's approval. The producer hires the production team, including the general manager, production manager, house manager, stage manager, etc., at their discretion. In many cases, contracts require that the producer use front of house staff (such as the house manager, box office, ushers, etc.) and backstage personnel (stage hands, electrician, carpenter, etc.) supplied by the theatre.

The producer creates, builds on and oversees the budget, sets ticket prices, chooses performance dates and times, and develops a marketing and advertising strategy for the production. Hiring a publicist and marketing team is one of the most important responsibilities of the producer. These teams are generally in place before the show is cast.

The producer collaborates with the director and all staff to plan a production timeline and deadlines for various aspects of the production to ensure a successful show opening and run. The producer and director oversee this timeline, with periodic re-assessment and modifications as needed.

The producer hires accountants, and perhaps already has legal representation. This is important, because of the liability issues mentioned above.  All bills, including payroll, must be paid on time, and taxes must be paid.  The producer oversees the budget.  The theatre owner provides box office services and turns over net ticket sales revenue. If sales fall under a set minimum level, the unprofitable show may close.  If ticket sales are good and the show makes a profit, the producer may get 50% of the net profit, the other 50% going to the investors.  Statistically, highly successful shows with big profits are the exception.  Independent commercial production is a high risk business.

Another kind of producer is the non-independent, or line producer, who facilitates other people's projects.  A repertory or repertoire or festival or non-profit or amateur organization, in most cases, uses a managing director, and creative decisions fall to the artistic director.  In theatres with no managing director, artistic directors often use the title producing artistic director or managing artistic director, to indicate a higher level of responsibility.

In the commercial world of Broadway, New York City and West End, London and touring, both nationally and internationally, producers are expected to be active members of the team, and their names appear above the show title. However, many "producers" are really investors or the theatre owner, and claim no say in running the production. A producer credit occasionally applies to people who perform special important services, such as finding a theatre or a star—but normally, the credit for such roles is associate producer. The producer works closely with the production team and cast to make all final decisions. The producer, ultimately, is one of the most important roles in a theatrical production.

Footnotes

External links
Internet Broadway Database
League of American Theatres and Producers
Tony Award winners video library-interviews with winners

-
Theatrical occupations
Theatrical management